Des Ryan (born 6 October 1967) is a former Australian rules footballer who played with Richmond in the Victorian Football League (VFL). He is the brother of fellow former Richmond player Stephen Ryan and the uncle of NBL players Aaron and Shaun Bruce. In 2016 Des took over the senior coaching role at Cheltenham FNC in the SFNL. Coaching the senior team to the 2019 Grand Final.

References

External links 

Living people
1967 births
Australian rules footballers from Victoria (Australia)
Richmond Football Club players
Australian rules football coaches